

CCG may refer to:

Coast guards
 Canadian Coast Guard
 China Coast Guard

Companies
 Chemical Computing Group, a Canadian pharmaceutical software company

Entertainment
 Collectible card game
 Command & Conquer: Generals, a 2003 video game
 Community-controlled game, a video game genre

Electronics 

 Copper Control Gear (CCG), a type of Electrical ballast Switch Start for lighting, alternative to ECG (Electronic Control Gear) Electronic.

Other
 Castor Cracking Group, a demo (computer art) group
 Centre for Computational Geography, University of Leeds, England
 Children's Cancer Study Group, conducted cancer research
 Clinical commissioning group, commissioners of many health services in England
 Combinatory categorial grammar, a grammar formalism
 Computational Chemistry Grid
 Country commercial guides, reports from the United States Commercial Service
 County Cricket Ground (disambiguation)
 Cross-correlogram, a statistical plotting technique
 Commission of Counter Ghoul, a fictional organization in the manga series Tokyo Ghoul
 CCG, a codon for the amino acid proline
 Climate Compatible Growth, a research-based programme funded by the United Kingdom Foreign, Commonwealth and Development Office